Cornelius Nugteren (February 7, 1928 – August 24, 2017) was a major general in the United States Air Force. He was commander of Warner Robins Air Logistics Center at Robins Air Force Base, Georgia from 1982 to his retirement in 1988.

Nugteren was inducted into the Air Force Logistics Command Order of the Sword in May 1985. In September 1986 he received the Air Force Association Ira Eaker Fellow award. In 2004 he was inducted into the Georgia Aviation Hall of Fame.

General Nugteren's U.S.Air Force (Major General) uniform is on display within the Reflections of Culture exhibit at Fernbank Museum, Atlanta, Georgia.

References

1928 births
United States Air Force generals
Recipients of the Legion of Merit
Recipients of the Air Force Distinguished Service Medal
2017 deaths